The 1977–78 NCAA Division II men's ice hockey season began in November 1977 and concluded on March 18 of the following year. This was the 14th season of second-tier college ice hockey.

The NCAA instituted a Division II national championship beginning with this season. Bowdoin was one of the two ECAC 2 tournament champions, however, because Bowdoin College barred its teams from participating in national tournaments at the time runner-up Merrimack was selected instead.

Due to the number of independent programs and the lack of any conference tournament for western teams, the NCAA also began holding a playoff series for western teams to help determine which schools would receive bids.

Despite already being part of ECAC 2, all SUNYAC schools, as well as a few other upstate New York schools formed the New York Collegiate Hockey Association (NYCHA). Because all teams were still members of ECAC 2 and the larger conference began holding two tournaments, doubled the number of participants beginning with this season, no NYCHA tournament was ever held.

Regular season

Season tournaments

Standings

1978 NCAA tournament

Note: * denotes overtime period(s)

See also
 1977–78 NCAA Division I men's ice hockey season
 1977–78 NCAA Division III men's ice hockey season

References

External links

 
NCAA